Enter Madame was a 1920 Broadway three-act comedy written by Gilda Varesi and Dolly Byrne,
produced and directed by Brock Pemberton. Varesi also played the lead role of opera singer Madame Lisa Della Robia 
with Norman Trevor playing her husband Gerald Fitzgerald. It ran a total of 350 performances from August 16, 1920 to October 2, 1920 at the Garrick Theatre, from October 4, 1920 - May 21, 1921 at the Fulton Theatre, then 
May 23, 1921 - April 1922 at Theatre Republic. It was included in Burns Mantle's The Best Plays of 1920-1921.

It was adapted into two films of the same name Enter Madame (1922) and  
the 1935 remake starring Cary Grant.

Cast

 Gilda Varesi as Madame Lisa Della Robia
 Norman Trevor as Gerald Fitzgerald
 Gavin Muir as	John Fitzgerald		
 Michellette Baroni as Bice	
 William Hallman as Archimede	
 Sheila Hayes as Aline Chalmers	
 Jane Meredith as Mrs. Flora Preston	
 Minnie Milne as Miss Smith	
 George Moto as Tamamoto	
 Francis M. Verdi as the doctor

References
 
 Archive. org

External links 
 

1920 plays
Broadway plays
Plays set in the United States
American plays adapted into films